The Libertarian Party of Delaware (LPDE) is the Delaware affiliate of the national Libertarian Party. It was founded in 1975.

Leadership

LPDE Platform
Libertarian philosophy centers on individual rights and the non-aggression principle (NAP). The LPDE statement of principles prioritizes the right to life, the right to liberty of speech and action (opposing government censorship in any form), and the right to property.

Electoral performance

Presidential

U.S. Senate

U.S. House of Representatives

Delaware Governor

See also
 List of state parties of the Libertarian Party (United States)

References

External links
 
 2020 campaign finance report (PDF)
 2022 campaign finance report (PDF)

Political parties in Delaware
Delaware